Roy Watson may refer to:

 Roy Watson (actor) (1876–1937), American actor
 Roy Watson (cricketer) (1933–2020), Australian cricketer